Santa's Little Helper is an American comedy film starring The Miz, Paige, AnnaLynne McCord, and Maryse Mizanin. The film was directed by Gil Junger. The film was released direct-to-DVD and digital on November 17, 2015.

Plot
Dax is a greedy, materialistic corporate hatchet-man, who we first see while closing down a community youth center just days before Christmas. Dax is subsequently fired in a corporate power play and, as he has been living beyond his means, loses his girlfriend, car and will soon be evicted from his house.

Meanwhile, at the North Pole, Santa Claus is looking to replace Santa's Little Helper, the second-in-command. Eleanor, the daughter of the outgoing Ho-Ho-Ho believes the job should be hers, but Santa, believing the North Pole could use a human influence, tasks Billie with reviewing Dax as a possible candidate. Billie is a kindly elf who is shunned by many of her elfin brethren because of a genetic defect that gives her round ears.

Billie gives Dax a series of difficult and embarrassing tasks to test his character, occasionally bailing him out with North Pole magic, while not revealing that it is Santa who is looking to hire him. Dax starts poorly but begins to soften during the course of the trials while also developing a mutual attraction to Billie. After Dax helps a mugging victim retrieve a precious ring, Billie declares him fit for the position.

Dax does not believe Billie's claim to work for Santa, so Santa himself arrives at Dax's home to convince him to take the job. A flashback reveals Dax had once been optimistic and friendly until he was framed for stealing money from the youth center he shut down in the film's opening.

Dax accepts the position of Santa's Little Helper, but Eleanor, using an obscure North Pole law, challenges him to the position with the winner being decided through a rigorous obstacle course. Dax loses and Eleanor is named Santa's Little Helper.

Dax returns home, having stolen a magic bell that can make wishes come true and plans to use it to save the youth center. Santa intercedes and halts his attempts at using magic, so Dax gives a rousing speech to rally the community and save the youth center from a wrecking ball and capture the director who really stole the money from it. Santa places Eleanor on the naughty list for her poor sportsmanship during the competition, thus disqualifying her from the position, and reveals it was Billie he was testing for the position of Santa's Little Helper all along. Dax and Billie then share a passionate kiss under a magical snowfall.

Cast
 The Miz as Dax
 AnnaLynne McCord as Billie
 Paige as Eleanor
 Eric Keenleyside as Santa Claus
 Maryse Ouelett Mizanin as Melody
 Peter Kelamis as Ezra Fells
 Nicholas Holmes as Kid #2
 Dylan Schmid as Marcus
 Kathryn Kirkpatrick as Mrs. Claus
 Geoff Gustafson as Fitz
 Tom McLaren as Harvey
 Karen Holness as Miriam
 Ben Wilkinson as Lane
 Mitchell Kummen as Young Dax
 Bruce Blain as Biker #1
 Patrick Sparling as Biker
 John Stewart as Tow Truck Operator
 Anthony Shudra as Birthday Boy
 Austin Abell as Kid #1
 Hector Johnson as Security Guard
 Lucas Rojen as Tommy
 Joshua Morettin as Mike

See also
 List of Christmas films
 Santa Claus in film

References

External links

2015 comedy films
2015 direct-to-video films
2010s American films
2010s Christmas comedy films
2010s English-language films
20th Century Fox direct-to-video films
American Christmas comedy films
Direct-to-video comedy films
Films directed by Gil Junger
Santa Claus in film
WWE Studios films